Abu al-Hasan Ali ibn Muhammad ibn Abd al-Haqq al-Yalisuti az-Zarwili known as al-Sughayyir (died 1319 in Fez) was a qadi of Taza and later qadi of Fez. He was of Berber origin. Al-Zarwili wrote a commentary of 12 volumes (Sharh al-Mudawwana) on the Mudawwana by Sahnun ibn Said and was considered a "qutb" (axis of his age) by his contemporaries.

References

1319 deaths
13th-century Berber people
14th-century Berber people
13th-century Moroccan judges
14th-century Moroccan judges
Berber writers
Moroccan Maliki scholars
Moroccan writers
People from Fez, Morocco
People from Taza
Year of birth unknown